The Solomon Star is a Solomon Islands daily, English language newspaper, launched on 25 May 1982. It is produced by the Solomon Star Company, whose owner, publisher and director was Father John Lamani, who served until his death in 2012. Lamani was also one of the paper's co-founders. The newspaper's editor, is Ofani Eremae.

References

External links

Companies of the Solomon Islands
News Corporation subsidiaries
Publications established in 1982
Newspapers published in the Solomon Islands
1982 establishments in the Solomon Islands